The following highways are numbered 1B:

Canada
  Alberta Highway 1B (former)
  British Columbia Highway 1B (former)

India

New Zealand
  New Zealand State Highway 1B

United States
  Delaware Route 1B
  Nebraska Spur 1B
  New Hampshire Route 1B
  New York State Route 1B (former)